Frew is an unincorporated community located in Leslie County, Kentucky, United States. Its post office  closed in 1984.

References

Unincorporated communities in Leslie County, Kentucky
Unincorporated communities in Kentucky